Tim Phillipps is an Australian actor perhaps best known for his roles in the soap opera Neighbours, drama series Bed of Roses and the movie Animal Kingdom. He has also appeared in the American television series Once Upon a Time and The Secret Circle. He provided the voice and motion capture for Dante in the video game DmC: Devil May Cry.

Early and personal life
Phillipps was born in Adelaide, South Australia. He has a brother Josh, who is a television presenter, and a sister Libby. Phillipps attended St Peter's College.

Phillipps became engaged to actress Jessica Lee Rose in March 2016. They married at the Royal Melbourne Yacht Squadron in early 2017. Phillipps announced on 8 July 2019 that he and Rose were expecting their first child. Their son was born in September 2019.

Career
In 2006, Australian teen magazine, Dolly, held a competition offering two readers a chance to win a three-month contract with the soap opera Neighbours. Phillipps auditioned, along with his best friend, Sam Clark, who eventually won the role of Ringo Brown. Phillipps was later cast in the recurring role of Fox, a figment of established character Paul Robinson's (Stefan Dennis) imagination. Phillipps went on to appear in Bed of Roses, Rush and the Australian feature film Animal Kingdom.

Shortly after moving to Los Angeles, Phillipps landed his first lead role in the US feature film Liars All, playing a soccer player called Billy. Of the role, Phillipps said "This role gives me the opportunity to really break the mould and I will have the chance to be someone really different and push my limits." Phillipps voices the character of Dante in DmC: Devil May Cry.

Phillipps was cast as Prince Thomas in ABC's Once Upon a Time. In January 2012, it was announced Phillipps had joined the cast of The CW drama The Secret Circle in the recurring role of Grant. Phillips made his debut as Grant in the episode "Lucky", which aired on 15 March 2012.

On 20 April 2014, it was confirmed that Phillipps had re-joined the cast of Neighbours in the role of Daniel Robinson, son of iconic couple Scott Robinson and Charlene Mitchell (Jason Donovan and Kylie Minogue). Phillipps hosted a documentary special celebrating the show's 30th anniversary titled Neighbours 30th: The Stars Reunite, which aired in Australia and the UK in March 2015. On 16 April 2016, it was announced Phillipps would leave Neighbours, along with Ariel Kaplan on 26 April. Phillipps revealed that it was not his decision to leave the show, and that the producers chose to write his character out. Phillipps reprised his role of Prince Thomas during the sixth season of Once Upon a Time.

Filmography

References

External links

Male actors from Melbourne
Australian male film actors
Australian male soap opera actors
Australian male video game actors
Australian male voice actors
21st-century Australian male actors
Living people
Year of birth missing (living people)
People from Adelaide